Tetratricopeptide repeat domain 8 (TTC8) also known as Bardet–Biedl syndrome 8 is a protein that in humans is encoded by the TTC8  gene.

Function 
TTC8 is associated with gamma-tubulin, BBS4, and PCM1 in the centrosome. PCM1 in turn is involved in centriolar replication during ciliogenesis.

TTC8 is located in the cilia of spermatids, retina, and bronchial epithelium cells.

Clinical significance 
Mutations in the TTC8 gene is one of 14 genes 
identified as causal for Bardet–Biedl syndrome.

References

Further reading

External links
  GeneReviews/NIH/NCBI/UW entry on Bardet–Biedl Syndrome a